Diplomats in Residence (DIRs) are career Foreign Service Officers and Specialists located throughout the U.S. who provide guidance and advice on careers, internships, and fellowships to students and professionals in the communities they serve. Diplomats in Residence represent 16 population-based regions that encompass the United States. These Foreign Service officials have roles similar to those of corporate or collegiate recruiters: traveling in an assigned region, planning recruitment events, and acting as a resource for anyone interested in a career with the United States Department of State.

Regions
Northwest (AK, Northern CA, OR, WA) represented by Ryan M. Gliha, who sits at the University of California, Berkeley.
Southern California (Southern CA, HI, NV) represented by Jason Vorderstrasse, who sits at the University of California, Los Angeles.
Southwest (AZ, NM, Western TX) represented by Laura Gritz, who sits at the University of New Mexico.
Rocky Mountains (CO, ID, MT, UT, WY) represented by Scott Smith, who sits at the University of Denver.
Texas (TX) represented Kris Sivertson, sits at the University of Texas at Austin.
Central South (AR, LA, MS) represented by J. Nathan Bland, who sits at Tulane University.
Central (KS, MO, NE, OK, SD) represented by Amanda Johnson, who sits at the University of Oklahoma.
Midwest (IA, IL, MN, ND, WI) represented by Ron Packowitz, who sits at the University of Illinois at Chicago.
North Central (IN, KY, MI, OH) represented by Shannon Farrell, who sits at the University of Michigan.
South (Northern AL, Northern GA, TN) represented by Allen DuBose, who sits at Morehouse College.
Southeast (Southern AL, Northern FL, Southern GA) represented by Sebron (CB) Toney, who sits at Florida A&M University.
South Florida (Southern FL) represented by Rebecca Kimbrell, who sits at Florida International University.
Mid-Atlantic (NC, SC, VA) represented by George Sibley, who sits at Duke University.
New York Metro (NJ, NY, PA) represented by Danielle Harms, who sits at the City College of New York.
New England (CT, MA, ME, NH, RI, VT) represented by Michelle Kayser, who sits at Tufts University.
DC Metro (DC, WV, DE, MD),  represented by Yolonda Kerney, who sits at Howard University.

References